The North London Hospice (NLH) is a registered charity offering hospice care to patients with life-limiting and terminal illnesses. It was founded in 1984 in response to the lack of aftercare for patients being discharged from hospital in north London following the closure of St. Columbus Hospital in 1981, which had been north London's only long-stay hospital. The north London Hospice was the United Kingdom's first multi-faith hospice.  It provides its specialist palliative and end-of-life care to people within the boroughs of Barnet, Enfield and Haringey. This takes place at its Finchley in-patient unit, which was opened in 1992, it's Health & Wellbeing Centre in Winchmore Hill and the majority of care is provided to people at home.

North London Hospice welcomes people from all faiths and communities, and those of no faith. The hospice provides physical, emotional and spiritual care to more than 3,500 patients a year (2020/21) and supports their families, friends and carers.

It's multi-professional team consists of specially trained doctors, nurses, physiotherapists, social workers, counsellors and chaplains. Everyone working at North London Hospice is committed to ensuring that patients receive full support, enabling them to choose how and where they receive care.

As a charity, care is provided free at the point of use. North London Hospice receives some funding from the NHS to support its services, but the majority of its funding comes from donations from its community and from income produced by its 17 charity shops.

References

External links 

Hospices in England
1984 establishments in England
Charities based in London
Health in the London Borough of Enfield